The Ottoman cadastral tax census (defter) of 1455 in the District of Branković (defter Vuk-ili) is one of the oldest Ottoman tax registers in the Balkans. The District of Branković at the time of the defter included parts of central Serbia (present-day Toplica District and the historical Raška region), part of northeastern Montenegro and parts of eastern Kosovo (the Kosovo plain). The defter recorded:
 480 villages,
 13,693 adult males,
 12,985 dwellings,
 14,087 household heads (480 widows and 13,607 adult males).

In 1972 the Sarajevo Institute of Middle Eastern Studies translated the original Turkish census and published an analysis of it Kovačević Mr. Ešref, Handžić A., Hadžibegović H. Oblast Brankovića – Opširni katastarski popis iz 1455. godine, Orijentalni institut, Sarajevo 1972. Subsequently, others have covered the subject as well such as Vukanović Tatomir, Srbi na Kosovu, Vranje, 1986.
 13,000 Serb dwellings present in all 480 villages and towns
 75 Vlach dwellings in 34 villages
 46 Albanian dwellings in 23 villages
 17 Bulgarian dwellings in 10 villages
 5 Greek dwellings in Lauša, Vučitrn
 1 Jewish dwelling in Vučitrn
 1 Croat dwelling

Of all names mentioned in this census, conducted by the Ottomans in 1455, covering a part of Eastern Kosovo, 96.3% of the names were of Slavic origin, 1.90% of Roman origin, 1.56% of uncertain origin, 0.26% of Albanian origin, 0.25% of Greek origin, etc. Serbian scholars consider that the defter indicates an overwhelmingly Serbian local population. Madgearu instead argues that the series of defters from 1455 onward "shows that Kosovo... was a mosaic of Serbian and Albanian villages", while Prishtina and Prizren already had significant Albanian Muslim populations, and that the same defter of 1455 indicates the presence of Albanians in Tetovo This interpretation of nationals living there is vague and unreliable to actually determine the Serb, Albanian, Bulgarian, Greek, Jews and Croats who lived in Kosovo in 1455 for the reason that the ottomans never conducted populations censuses based on nationality or language. The Ottomans cadastral tax records only mention the religion of the dwellers in Kosovo not nationalities. The accuracy and the consistency of the registration has been doubted as shown in the example of Janjevo (a primarily Catholic Croat  village in eastern Kosovo) which according to the reading of the register had only one Croat household.

As the defter only recorded timar holders and dependent farmers, groups which socially weren't part of any of these two classes were not included in the defter. That is most probably the reason why Vlachs (as a social category which was not part of the Ottoman feudal hierarchy) were not recorded in the region which the defter covered.

See also 
 1487 defter of the District of Branković
 1582–83 defter of the Sanjak of Scutari

References

Sources

15th century in Serbia
Demographic history of Serbia
Defter